Hendrik Petrus Berlage was a Dutch architect.

Berlage may also refer to:
 Berlage Institute, Rotterdam
 Berlage (crater), a crater on the Moon
 Beurs van Berlage, a building in Amsterdam designed by H. P. Berlage

Other people with the surname
Anton Berlage, a German theologian